AFLAR, the African League of Associations for Rheumatology is an organisation of member Rheumatology professional bodies from the African continent and is a partner in ILAR, International League of Associations of Rheumatology. AFLAR publishes the African Journal of Rheumatology twice a year.

External links
Official website of AFLAR
Conference abstracts in Clinical Rheumatology
ILAR website

Rheumatology organizations
Medical associations based in Africa